Vietnam Naval Academy is one of Vietnamese military academies belongs to Vietnam People's Navy for training naval commanding officers in division level and commanding staffs in tactical/campaign level, include undergraduates and postgraduates of military.

The forerunner of Vietnam Naval Academy is Coastal Training School, was established on April 26, 1955 by the General Staff. The school has changed name in several times such as the Naval Training School in 1959, the Naval School of Vietnam in 1961, the Naval Officers School in 1967, School of Commander Naval engineering in 1980. Finally, the school has named Naval Academy in 1993.

After 55 years of construction, combat and growth, Vietnam Naval Academy has trained thousands of officers and technical staffs for major specialized fields such as: control vessel; mines - anti-mine; missile anti-submarine; gunship; information; radar - sonar; coastal radar; ship factory and power; the commander of the Vietnam Coast Guard and Border Defense Force.

In addition, Vietnam Naval Academy has trained officers for Royal Cambodian Navy and Lao People's Navy.

History

Mission
 Training naval officers with bachelor's degrees
 Training postgraduate degrees for commanding officers and technical staff
 Training Masters and PhD military science
 Research naval military science and other duties

Staff
10.5% of the faculty staff have a doctoral degree, three Associate Professors, seven Excellent Teachers.

Achievements and rewards
 Hero of the People's Armed Forces: 
 Military Exploit Order:

Faculties
The academy has 13 faculties:
 Faculty of Navigation
 Faculty of Strategy and Campaign
 Faculty of Command Staff
 Faculty of Electrical Engineering
 Faculty of Missile and Gunship
 Faculty of Underwater weapons
 Faculty of Radar and Information
 Faculty of Engineering facilities
 Faculty of Coast Guard
 Faculty of Communist Party Working 
 Faculty of Marxist Leninist
 Faculty of Natural Sciences and Foreign Language
 Faculty of Generally Military
And 02 training centers:
 Center for practice and crew training
 National Center for training maritime search and rescue

See also
 Vietnam People's Navy
 Vietnam Marine Police
 Vietnamese military academies

References

Universities in Vietnam
Vietnam People's Navy
Naval academies
Military academies of Vietnam